"The Scene" is the first single from Canadian rock band Big Sugar's 1998 album, Heated. The song was very successful in Canada, reaching #1 on Canada's Alternative chart. The song was ranked #98 on MuchMore's Top 100 Big Tunes of The 90s.

Music video
The music video for "The Scene" was directed by Andrew MacNaughtan. The video features Gordie Johnson riding a scooter down Burlington Street in Hamilton and the band performing in a boxing ring. The video was nominated for "Best Video" at the 2000 Juno Awards.

Charts

References

1998 singles
Big Sugar songs
Music videos directed by Andrew MacNaughtan
1998 songs
A&M Records singles
Songs written by Gordie Johnson